John J. Hock (March 7, 1928 – December 9, 2000) was an American football offensive lineman who played for the Chicago Cardinals from 1950 to 1952 and Los Angeles Rams from 1953 to 1957. He was named to the Pro Bowl one time. He was co-captain of a Santa Clara University (California) football squad that defeated Bear Bryant's highly ranked University of Kentucky team in the 1950 Orange Bowl.  Hock also participated in the Olympic Trials for wrestling and was a veteran of the Korean War.  After his professional football career ended with a severe knee injury, Hock went on to a successful career as an executive with a variety of freight forwarding and transportation companies. Hock died from lung cancer in December 2000. Born in Pittsburgh, Pennsylvania, he was survived by his wife Bernadette "Micki", seven children and thirteen grandchildren.

References
John Hock's obituary

1928 births
2000 deaths
American football offensive linemen
Players of American football from Pittsburgh
Santa Clara Broncos football players
Chicago Cardinals players
Los Angeles Rams players
Western Conference Pro Bowl players
Deaths from lung cancer